William Gilbert Strang (born November 27, 1934), usually known as simply Gilbert Strang or Gil Strang, is an American mathematician, with contributions to finite element theory, the calculus of variations, wavelet analysis and linear algebra. He has made many contributions to mathematics education, including publishing mathematics textbooks. Strang is the MathWorks Professor of Mathematics at the Massachusetts Institute of Technology.  He teaches Linear Algebra, Computational Science, and Engineering, Learning from Data, and his lectures are freely available through MIT OpenCourseWare.

Biography

Strang was born in Chicago in 1934. His parents William and Mary Catherine Strang migrated to the USA from Scotland.  He and his sister Vivian grew up in Washington DC and Cincinnati, and went to high school at Principia in St. Louis.  

Strang completed his undergraduate degree (S.B.) in  1955 from the Massachusetts Institute of Technology. He was the recipient of a Rhodes Scholarship to University of Oxford, where he received his B.A. and M.A. from Balliol College in 1957.

Strang earned his Ph. D. from University of California, Los Angeles in 1959 as a National Science Foundation Fellow, under the supervision of  Peter K. Henrici. His dissertation was titled "Difference Methods for Mixed Boundary Value Problems".

While at Oxford, Strang met his future wife Jillian Shannon, and they married in 1958. Following his Ph.D. at UCLA, they have lived in Wellesley, Massachusetts for almost all of his 62 years on the MIT faculty. The Strangs have three sons David, John, and Robert and describe themselves as a very close-knit family.

Strang plans to retire in 2023.

Strang's teaching has focused on linear algebra which has helped the subject become essential for students of many majors. His linear algebra video lectures are popular on YouTube and MIT OpenCourseware. Strang founded Wellesley-Cambridge Press to publish Introduction to Linear Algebra (now in 6th edition) and ten other books.

University Positions 
Following his PhD studies, from 1959 to 1961, Strang was a C. L. E. Moore instructor at M.I.T. in the Mathematics department. From 1961-1962 he was a  NATO Postdoctoral Fellow at Oxford University. Since 1962, Strang has been a mathematics professor at MIT.

He has received Honorary Titles and Fellowships from the following institutes:
 Alfred P. Sloan Fellow (1966–1967)
Honorary Professor, Xi'an Jiaotong University, China (1980)
Honorary Fellow, Balliol College, Oxford University (1999)
Honorary Member, Irish Mathematical Society (2002)
Fellow of the Society for Industrial and Applied Mathematics (2009) 
 Doctor Honoris Causa, University of Toulouse (2010)
 Fellow of the American Mathematical Society (2012)
 Doctor Honoris Causa, Aalborg University (2013)

Awards 
 Rhodes Scholar (1955)
 National Science Foundation Graduate Research Fellowship (1957)
 Chauvenet Prize, Mathematical Association of America (1977)
 American Academy of Arts and Sciences (1985)
 Award for Distinguished Service to the Profession, Society for Industrial and Applied Mathematics (2003)
 Lester R. Ford Award (2005)
 Von Neumann Medal, US Association for Computational Mechanics (2005)
 Haimo Prize, Mathematical Association of America (2007)
 Su Buchin Prize, International Congress (ICIAM, 2007)
 Henrici Prize (2007)
 National Academy of Sciences (2009)
 Irwin Sizer Award for the Most Significant Improvement to MIT Education (2020)

Service
 President, Society for Industrial and Applied Mathematics (1999, 2000)
 Chair, U.S. National Committee on Mathematics (2003–2004)
 Chair, National Science Foundation (NSF) Advisory Panel on Mathematics
 Board Member, International Council for Industrial and Applied Mathematics (ICIAM)
Abel Prize Committee (2003–2005)

Publications

Books and monographs
Introduction to Linear Algebra, Sixth Edition, Wellesley-Cambridge Press (2023), https://math.mit.edu/~gs/linearalgebra
Linear Algebra for Everyone (2020)
Linear Algebra and Learning from Data (2019)
Calculus (2017) https://ocw.mit.edu/courses/res-18-001-calculus-online-textbook-spring-2005/pages/textbook/
Introduction to Linear Algebra, Fifth Edition (2016)
Differential Equations and Linear Algebra (2014) http://math.mit.edu/dela/
Essays in Linear Algebra (2012)
Algorithms for Global Positioning, with Kai Borre (2012)
An Analysis of the Finite Element Method, with George Fix (2008)
Computational Science and Engineering (2007)
Linear Algebra and Its Applications, Fourth Edition (2005)
Linear Algebra, Geodesy, and GPS, with Kai Borre (1997)
Wavelets and Filter Banks, with Truong Nguyen (1996)

See also

 The Joint spectral radius, introduced by Strang and Rota in the early 60s.
 Strang splitting
 Strang-Fix conditions

References

External links
 
 
Wellesley Cambridge Press (USA) www.wellesleycambridge.com/
Wellesley Publishers (India) www.wellesleypublishers.com/

1934 births
Living people
20th-century American mathematicians
21st-century American mathematicians
Massachusetts Institute of Technology School of Science faculty
Mathematics educators
Fellows of the Society for Industrial and Applied Mathematics
American Rhodes Scholars
Massachusetts Institute of Technology alumni
University of California, Los Angeles alumni
People from Chicago
Members of the United States National Academy of Sciences
Fellows of the American Mathematical Society
Presidents of the Society for Industrial and Applied Mathematics
Foreign Members of the Russian Academy of Sciences
Sloan Research Fellows
Mathematicians from Illinois
American textbook writers